Maddi Torre Larrañaga (born 30 March 1996) is a Spanish footballer who plays as a defender for Real Sociedad.

Club career
Torre started her career in the youth academy of Bizkerre in Getxo. She signed for Athletic Club in 2011, spending most of her time there developing in the B-team, although in 2015–16 she made her Primera División debut and contributed 13 appearances (all but one as a substitute) and one goal as Athletic won the title. That summer Torre moved on to Santa Teresa, switching to Real Betis in 2017 and to hometown club Real Sociedad a year later; she missed their Copa de la Reina victory in 2019 due to a pre-match injury.

References

External links
Profile at Real Sociedad

1996 births
Living people
Women's association football defenders
Spanish women's footballers
Footballers from San Sebastián
Athletic Club Femenino players
Santa Teresa CD players
Real Betis Féminas players
Real Sociedad (women) players
Primera División (women) players
Athletic Club Femenino B players
Spain women's youth international footballers